The Copey anole (Anolis alocomyos) is a species of lizard in the family Dactyloidae. The species is found in Costa Rica.

References

Anoles
Reptiles of Costa Rica
Endemic fauna of Costa Rica
Reptiles described in 2014
Taxa named by Gunther Köhler
Taxa named by Sebastian Lotzkat